Gary, or Garry, O'Neill, or O'Neil, may refer to:

Gary O'Neil (born 1983), English former professional footballer
Gary O'Neil (Neighbours), a fictional character on Australian soap Neighbours
Garry O'Neill (born 1974), Australian martial artist
Gary O'Neill (born 1982), Irish footballer who played for Shelbourne in the 2000s
Gary O'Neill (born 1995) Irish footballer who, as of 2022, plays for Shamrock Rovers

See also
Gary Neil, Scottish footballer